Robert Houston Eggers (born July 7, 1983) is an American filmmaker and production designer. He is best known for writing and directing the historical horror films The Witch (2015) and The Lighthouse (2019), as well as directing and co-writing the historical fiction epic film The Northman (2022). His films are noted for their folkloric and mythological elements, as well as his efforts to ensure historical authenticity.

Early life
Eggers was born in New York City in 1983 to Kelly Houston. Eggers does not know who his biological father is. Soon after, he and his mother moved to Laramie, Wyoming where his mother met and married Walter Eggers, with whom she had twins, Max and Sam. The family then moved to Lee, New Hampshire, in 1990 when his stepfather became a provost at the University of New Hampshire. He moved to New York City in 2001 to attend the American Musical and Dramatic Academy.

Eggers was inspired by his childhood in New England and frequently visited the Plimoth Plantation in Plymouth, Massachusetts, while writing his first feature.

Career 
Eggers began his career as a designer and director of theatre productions in New York before transitioning to working in film. In 2015, Eggers made his directorial debut with horror film The Witch, based on his own script and starring Anya Taylor-Joy. The film premiered at the 2015 Sundance Film Festival on January 27, 2015. A24 acquired the film, and released it theatrically on February 19, 2016. Critical reception was largely positive, and the film earned over $40 million against a budget of $4 million.

His follow-up film, the horror fantasy The Lighthouse (2019), also a period piece, was critically acclaimed. Eggers directed the film, and co-wrote the screenplay with his brother, Max Eggers, and it stars Robert Pattinson and Willem Dafoe.

In 2022, Eggers's Amleth-inspired Viking epic film The Northman was released, starring Alexander Skarsgård, Nicole Kidman, Anya Taylor-Joy, Ethan Hawke, Björk, and Willem Dafoe.

In July 2015, it was reported that Eggers would write and direct a remake of the 1922 silent film Nosferatu, based on the Dracula mythology. The film is set to be produced by Jay Van Hoy and Lars Knudsen for Studio 8. In November 2016, Eggers expressed surprise that the Nosferatu remake was going to be his second film, saying, "It feels ugly and blasphemous and egomaniacal and disgusting for a filmmaker in my place to do Nosferatu next. I was really planning on waiting a while, but that's how fate shook out." Eggers had previously directed his high school's performance of the Nosferatu play, and was hired to direct a professional version of the play due to his work. Eggers credited this as the event that inspired him to pursue a career in filmmaking. Eggers eventually opted to delay his version of the film, going on to direct The Lighthouse and The Northman first. Taylor-Joy and Harry Styles were attached to the cast, but both dropped out in 2022. In September 2022, it was reported that the film will star Bill Skarsgård in the titular role alongside Lily-Rose Depp. Eggers plans to make Nosferatu his fourth film.

Eggers is currently developing a miniseries based on the life of Rasputin. He also developed a medieval film called The Knight, that was ultimately not produced.

Personal life 
Eggers is married to Dr. Alexandra Shaker, a clinical psychologist whom he has known since childhood. They have a son, Houston (born 2018/19). They reside in Brooklyn, New York City.

Filmography 

Short films

Feature films

Production designer

Influences and style 
Eggers has cited the 1922 German Expressionist horror film Nosferatu and 1983 documentary From Star Wars to Jedi: The Making of a Saga as his biggest influences on becoming a filmmaker. In 2014 interview with Filmmaker, Eggers described fairytales, folktales, comparative religion and mythology as his biggest interests, and thus his films are characterized by their folkloric, mythological and historical elements.

Frequent Collaborators
Eggers also is known for frequent collaborations with a small repertoire of actors—most notably Willem Dafoe, Ralph Ineson and Anya Taylor-Joy—and cinematographer Jarin Blaschke.

Reception

References

Further reading

External links 
 
 

1983 births
Living people
People from Lee, New Hampshire
American male screenwriters
Sundance Film Festival award winners
Horror film directors
Film directors from New Hampshire
Screenwriters from New Hampshire
American production designers
Film producers from New York (state)
Film directors from New York City
Screenwriters from New York (state)
21st-century American screenwriters
Screenwriters from Wyoming
Film directors from Wyoming